Gumi is the second largest city in Gyeongsangbuk-do, South Korea. It is located on the Nakdong River, halfway between Daegu and Gimcheon, also lies on the Gyeongbu Expressway and Gyeongbu Line railway which are the principal traffic routes of the country.

The city is an industrial center of the country with many companies, including Samsung Electronics, LG Electronics, LG Display, having a manufacturing presence and R&D Centres there. 

The primary industries are electronics and IT Manufacturing such as Smartphone, Tablet computer, 5G networking equipment, Semiconductors, OLED and other Displays, Carbonated fibres, rubber, plastic and metal products. In Gumi, 1,772 companies employ over 80,000 workers. It is the largest scale in Korea. In 2009, the city exported the largest amount in the country and accounted for 96.9% of trade surplus of Korea in 2000 to 2009.

The former President of South Korea, Park Chung-hee, was born in the city.

History
In the Three Kingdoms period, Gumi was part of the territory of the Silla Kingdom. The first Silla temple, Dorisa Temple, was constructed here by Monk Ado who is also the one that made Jikjisa.

The town was the birthplace of the South Korean president Park Chung-hee. His birth home is a museum today. It was during his administration that the South Korean government selected Gumi as a site for major industrial development. Gumi developed rapidly during the 1960s, growing from a small rural town into a large city thanks to huge infusions of development money from the government. It was selected for development for some practical reasons such as its easy access to transportation infrastructure, and its location in the industrialized Yeongnam region.

Administrative divisions
The city center of Gumi is divided into 17 dong, or neighborhood units.  The hinterland is divided into 5 myeon, or rural areas, and 3 eup, or large villages. Sandong was promoted from a myeon to a eup on 1 January 2021.

People 
 Former South Korean president Park Chung-hee
 Former South Korean president Park Geun-hye - daughter of Park Chung-hee
 Former KCIA director and assassin Kim Jae-gyu
 Professional golfer Baek Kyu-jung (LPGA of Korea Tour)
 Singer and I Am A Singer 4 finalist Hwang Chi-yeul
 Singer and H.O.T. member Jang Woo-hyuk, 
 Singer and g.o.d member Kim Tae-woo
 Esports player Lee Yun-yeol-known as "NaDa"
 Girl group member Kim Chanmi from AOA
 Kim Hyo Suk - the first person in South Korea to obtain a doctoral degree in Art Therapy.

Population: At present, the population of Gumi is 427,770 (as of February 19, 2019).

Sport
Gumi was the homeground of the KB Insurance Stars volleyball team until July 2017, when the club relocated to Uijeongbu. The team played at the Park Chung-hee Gymnasium.

Geumo Mountain

Geumo Mountain (Geumo San) Provincial Park is a hiking destination.  The peak at 976 m above sea level is one of the eight famous spots in the Yeongman area and is the location of the start of the nature preservation campaign in Korea.  The park has an amusement area called Geumo Land and the Geumo reservoir.  There are several interesting sites on the mountain that include:

Doesan Cave named after the Buddhist monk Doesan who attained a state of nirvana in the cave.  He was a master of the theory of "divination based on topography" in the later Shilla dynasty.

Daehye Waterfall is 27 m high and is especially full during the rainy season.  It can be completely dry during periods without rain and is frozen in winter.

The HaeUn Buddhist Temple is also near the top of the cable car route.

The YakSa Temple is an active Buddhist temple and is said to have been created to commemorate Saint Ulsang's attainment of nirvana.  It is sited near the top of the mountain and can be reached both from the peak and by a trail from the bottom.  It has a unique bell that sits on a separate spike of rock connected by a suspension bridge.

The Ma Ae Cliff Buddha (National Treasure #490) is carved into the corner of a cliff face and is thought to have been created during the Goryeo dynasty.

The Doesan Cave, Daehye Waterfall and HaeUn Buddhist Temple are all easily reached by taking the cable car from the entrance of the park and then hiking a short distance. The YakSa Temple and the Ma Ae cliff Buddha statue are both near the summit of Geumo Mountain and require about one to two hours of hiking to reach them.

Industrial accident
On September 27, 2012 workers at the Hube Global plant in Gumi were unloading hydrofluoric acid (HF) from a tanker when an explosion occurred causing about 8 tonnes of the acid to leak into the surrounding area. The leak caused 5 deaths initially and prompted more than 3000 people to seek medical attention at local hospitals. Local rice and grape crops were ruined because the acid caused them to wither. Approximately 3,200 livestock were exposed. The acid, which can etch glass and is used in the electronics industry, caused damage to at least 1,000 vehicles. Total damage costs as of October 10, 2012 were about 16 million USD.

Climate

Sister cities

 Plano, Texas, United States (since 1986)
 Zhongli District, Taoyuan, Taiwan (since 1989)
 Otsu, Shiga, Japan (since 1990)
 Bishkek, Kyrgyzstan (since 1991)
 Shenyang, Liaoning, People's Republic of China (since 1997)
 Changsha, Hunan, People's Republic of China (since 1998)
 Mexicali, Baja California, Mexico (since 1998)
 Eindhoven, Netherlands (since 2003)
 Weinan, Shaanxi, People's Republic of China (since 2014)
 Bangalore, Karnataka, India (since 2018)

See also
 Geography of South Korea
 List of cities in South Korea

Notes and references

External links

City government website (Korean)
City government website (Chinese)
City government website (English)

 

 
Cities in North Gyeongsang Province